is a Japanese footballer currently studying at the Kyoto Sangyo University.

Career statistics

Club
.

Notes

References

External links

2001 births
Living people
Japanese footballers
Kyoto Sangyo University alumni
Association football midfielders
J3 League players
Gamba Osaka players
Gamba Osaka U-23 players